Amyloporiella is a genus of fungi in the family Polyporaceae.

External links
Amyloporiella at Index Fungorum

Polyporaceae